St. Valentin auf der Haide is a village in South Tyrol in the parish of Graun im Vinschgau. The village on the Reschen Pass lies at a height of 1,472 metres between the Haidersee and Reschensee on the scree slope of the Mals Heath. St. Valentin auf der Haide has about 800 inhabitants who predominantly earn a living from summer and winter tourism.

St. Valentin also has a ski resort, Haideralm, which is part of the Skiparadies Reschenpass. Since 1965 St. Valentin has been twinned with the municipal district of Überlingen in Baden-Württemberg, Germany.

External links 

 

Frazioni of South Tyrol